TBOX is a multi-platform c library for unix, windows, mac, ios, android, etc. It's made available under the Apache License 2.0.

TBOX includes asio, stream, network, container, algorithm, object, memory, database, string, charset, math, libc, libm, utils and other library modules.

The stream io library 
 supports file, data, http and socket source
 supports the stream filter for gzip charset and ..
 implements the multi-stream transfer using asio

The asynchronous io library 
 supports reactor and proactor mode
 using epoll, poll, select, kqueue and iocp os system api

The database library 
 supports mysql and sqlite3 database and enumerates data using the iterator mode

The xml parser library 
 supports DOM and SAX mode and supports xpath.

The serialization and deserialization library. 
 supports xml, json, bplist, xplist, binary formats

The memory library 
 implements some memory pools for optimizating memory.
 supports fast memory error detecting. it can detect the following types of bugs for the debug mode:
 # out-of-bounds accesses to heap and globals
 # use-after-free
 # double-free, invalid free
 # memory leaks

The container library 
 implements hash table, single list, double list, vector, stack, queue and min/max heap.
 supports iterator mode for algorithm.

The algorithm library 
 using the iterator mode
 implements find, binary find and reverse find algorithm.
 implements sort, bubble sort, quick sort, heap sort and insert sort algorithm.
 implements count, walk items, reverse walk items, for_all and rfor_all.

The network library 
 implements dns(cached), ssl(openssl and polarssl), http and cookies
 supports asynchronous io mode for dns, ssl and http using the asio and stream library

The platform library 
 implements timer, faster and lower precision timer
 implements atomic and atomic64 operation
 implements spinlock, mutex, event, semaphore, thread and thread pool
 implements file, socket operation

The charset library 
 supports utf8, utf16, gbk, gb2312, uc2 and uc4
 supports big endian and little endian mode

The zip library 
 supports gzip, zlibraw, zlib formats using the zlib library if exists
 implements lzsw, lz77 and rlc algorithm

The utils library 
 implements base32, base64, md5 and sha algorithm
 implements assert and trace output for the debug mode

The math library 
 implements random generator
 implements fast fixed-point calculation, supports 6-bits, 16-bits, 30-bits fixed-point number

The libc library 
 implements lightweight libc library interfaces, the interface name contains tb_xxx prefix for avoiding conflict.
 implements strixxx strrxxx wcsixxx wcsrxxx interface extension.
 optimizates some frequently-used interface, .e.g. memset, memcpy, strcpy ...
 implements memset_u16, memset_u32, memset_u64 extension interfaces.

The libm library 
 implements lightweight libm library interfaces, the interface name contains tb_xxx prefix for avoiding conflict.
 supports float and double type.

External links 
 TBOX

C (programming language) libraries
Free computer libraries